Cinderella (German: Aschenbrödel) is a 1916 German silent film directed by Urban Gad and starring Asta Nielsen and Max Landa.

Cast
Asta Nielsen as Lotte 
Max Landa as von Harten

References

External links

Films of the German Empire
Films directed by Urban Gad
German silent feature films
German black-and-white films
Films based on Charles Perrault's Cinderella
1910s German films